Diphenic acid, also known as Dibenzoic acid, is an organic compound with the formula (C6H4CO2H)2.  It is the most studied of several isomeric dicarboxylic acids of biphenyl.  It is a white solid that can be prepared in the laboratory from anthranilic acid via the diazonium salt.  It is the product of the microbial action on phenanthrene.

The compound forms a variety of coordination polymers.  It also exhibits atropisomerism.

References

Biphenyls
Benzoic acids
Carboxylic acids